The First Baptist Church of Scituate is a historic Baptist church building at 656 Country Way in Scituate, Massachusetts.  It is a -story wood-frame structure with eclectic Victorian styling, including quoining at the corners and bracketed eaves.  It has a three-part round-arch window in the front-facing gable end, with a square tower rising to an octagonal spire set to its left.  The church was built in 1869–70 as the second sanctuary for a Baptist congregation founded in 1815. The architect was Shepard S. Woodcock.

The church and its associated parsonage were listed on the National Register of Historic Places in 2015.

See also
National Register of Historic Places listings in Plymouth County, Massachusetts

References

External links
First Baptist Church Official Website

19th-century Baptist churches in the United States
Baptist churches in Massachusetts
Buildings and structures in Scituate, Massachusetts
Churches completed in 1870
Churches in Plymouth County, Massachusetts
Churches on the National Register of Historic Places in Massachusetts
Gothic Revival church buildings in Massachusetts
National Register of Historic Places in Plymouth County, Massachusetts